Elisabeth of Württemberg (after 1412 - after 29 April 1476) was a German noblewoman.

Life
The daughter of Eberhard III, Count of Württemberg and Elisabeth of Nuremberg, she was engaged to Albert III, Duke of Bavaria on 15 January 1528. However, after his secret marriage to the maid Agnes Bernauer, she later married Count John IV of Werdenberg at the court of Ludwig I, Count of Württemberg-Urach - their children included John II of Werdenberg.

Sources

House of Württemberg
1412 births
1476 deaths
Daughters of monarchs